The Poet X, published March 6, 2018 by HarperTeen, is a young adult novel by Elizabeth Acevedo. Fifteen-year-old Xiomara, also known as "X" or "Xio," works through the tension and conflict in her family by writing poetry. The book, a New York Times bestseller, was well received and won multiple awards at the 2019 Youth Media Awards.

Plot 
Xiomara Batista is a fifteen-year-old Dominican teenager living in Harlem who loves to write poetry. Though she longs to share it with the world, her religious mother is only concerned with her being confirmed, which has been put off for three years. She feels inferior to her brother, Xavier (affectionately called Twin) as he receives much praise for his work.
During the school year, she develops a love for her lab partner, Aman. However, the relationship is broken when her mother sees them kissing on a train.
Eventually, her mother finds her poetry, forcing a confrontation between the two.

Reception and awards 
The Poet X was well reviewed, receiving starred reviews from The Horn Book Magazine, Kirkus Reviews, Publishers Weekly, Shelf Awareness, and School Library Journal, as well as positive reviews from Booklist, the Bulletin of the Center for Children’s Books, and The New York Times. 

The audiobook received a starred review from Booklist. It was the fourth most ordered book at the New York Public Library in 2018.

In 2018, Kirkus Reviews named The Poet X one of the best young adult books of the year.

References 

2018 American novels
2018 children's books
American young adult novels
African-American young adult novels
Hispanic and Latino American novels
National Book Award for Young People's Literature winning works
Michael L. Printz Award-winning works
Carnegie Medal in Literature winning works
Literature by Hispanic and Latino American women
Novels set in New York City
Harlem in fiction
Quill Tree Books books